Thevannoor is a village near Ayoor in Kollam district, Kerala, India.

History

Thevannoor got its name from the Malayalam usage "Thevante Ooru " or "devante ooru" which means "Home Of God ".Here devan or thevan means the bhoodevas ,ie; the Brahmins.Thevannoor is a place inhabited by large number of Brahmins from very ancient time onwards. The old village was all inside the Elamadu Panchayathu on four sides with the Thevannoor Devi Kshethram at the center.

Location

Thevannoor as it is known in Malayalam, is today literally the heart of Elamadu.  It is linked by MC Road to  Thiruvananthapuram and Kollam, and is the point of diversion to Kottarakkara Sree Mahaganapathi Temple.

School
The Panchayath's main Govt.School, as well as the Village Knowledge center, (for long distance buses) are both a few minute walk from the

Temples

Nearby places
 Anchal - 8 km
 Ambalamkunnu - 7 km
 Ayoor - 4 km
 Elamadu- 4 km
 Kottarakkara - 17 km
 Oyoor - 14 km
 Nilamel - 10 km
 Valakom- 6 km
 Veliyam - 13 km

References

External links
 About Thevannoor

Villages in Kollam district